Siedmica  is a village in the administrative district of Gmina Paszowice, within Jawor County, Lower Silesian Voivodeship, in south-western Poland.

During World War II, a German forced labour subcamp of the prison in Jawor was operated in the village.

References

Siedmica